Sarab-e Sheykh Ali (also romanized as Sarāb-e Sheykh ‘Ālī and Sarāb Shaikh ‘Ali) is a village in Firuzabad Rural District, Firuzabad District, Selseleh County, Lorestan Province, Iran. At the 2006 census, its population was 480, in 95 families.

References 

Towns and villages in Selseleh County